The 2018 Whelen Trusted to Perform 200 was the 32nd stock car race of the 2018 NASCAR Xfinity Series season, the third and final race in the Round of 8, and the 20th iteration of the event. The race was held on Saturday, November 10, 2018, in Avondale, Arizona, at ISM Raceway, a 1-mile (1.6 km) permanent low-banked tri-oval race track. The race took the scheduled 200 laps to complete. At race's end, Christopher Bell of Joe Gibbs Racing would dominate the late stages of the race to win his eighth career NASCAR Xfinity Series win, his seventh win of the season, and a guaranteed spot in the Championship 4. To fill out the podium, Daniel Hemric and Matt Tifft of Richard Childress Racing would finish second and third, respectively.

Background 

ISM Raceway – also known as PIR – is a one-mile, low-banked tri-oval race track located in Avondale, Arizona. It is named after the nearby metropolitan area of Phoenix. The motorsport track opened in 1964 and currently hosts two NASCAR race weekends annually. PIR has also hosted the IndyCar Series, CART, USAC and the Rolex Sports Car Series. The raceway is currently owned and operated by International Speedway Corporation.

The raceway was originally constructed with a 2.5 mi (4.0 km) road course that ran both inside and outside of the main tri-oval. In 1991 the track was reconfigured with the current 1.51 mi (2.43 km) interior layout. PIR has an estimated grandstand seating capacity of around 67,000. Lights were installed around the track in 2004 following the addition of a second annual NASCAR race weekend.

ISM Raceway is home to two annual NASCAR race weekends, one of 13 facilities on the NASCAR schedule to host more than one race weekend a year. The track is both the first and last stop in the western United States, as well as the fourth and penultimate track on the schedule.

Entry list

Practice

First practice 
The first practice session was held on Friday, November 9, at 12:35 PM MST, and would last for 50 minutes.

Second and final practice 
The second and final practice session, sometimes referred to as Happy Hour, was held on Friday, November 9, at 2:35 PM MST, and would last for 50 minutes.

Qualifying 
Qualifying was held on Saturday, November 10, at 10:35 AM MST. Since ISM Raceway is under 2 miles (3.2 km), the qualifying system was a multi-car system that included three rounds. The first round was 15 minutes, where every driver would be able to set a lap within the 15 minutes. Then, the second round would consist of the fastest 24 cars in Round 1, and drivers would have 10 minutes to set a lap. Round 3 consisted of the fastest 12 drivers from Round 2, and the drivers would have 5 minutes to set a time. Whoever was fastest in Round 3 would win the pole.

No drivers would fail to qualify.

Full qualifying results

Race results 
Stage 1 Laps: 45

Stage 2 Laps: 45

Stage 3 Laps: 110

References 

2018 NASCAR Xfinity Series
NASCAR races at Phoenix Raceway
November 2018 sports events in the United States
2018 in sports in Arizona